Harry Edward Sears (May 11, 1870 – October 19, 1920) was an American sport shooter who competed in the 1912 Summer Olympics.

He was part of the 50 metre military pistol team, which won he gold medal. He also participated in the 30 m rapid fire pistol event and finished 7th and in the 50 metre pistol event finished 16th.

He graduated from Harvard College and Harvard Medical School.

References

1870 births
1920 deaths
American male sport shooters
ISSF pistol shooters
Shooters at the 1912 Summer Olympics
Olympic gold medalists for the United States in shooting
Olympic medalists in shooting
Medalists at the 1912 Summer Olympics
Harvard College alumni
Harvard Medical School alumni